Nio Joe Lan (also known by the Indonesianised name Junus Nur Arif; 29 December 1904 – 13 February 1973) was a Chinese-Indonesian writer, journalist, and history teacher.

Biography
Nio was born on 29 December 1904 in Batavia, Dutch East Indies (now Jakarta, Indonesia), the son of a rich batik merchant and his wife. Other sources state that he was born in Paalmerah, Djambi Residency. Although he completed his studies in 1924, Nio was unable to enter the field; his father had died recently and his mother had been cheated out of the factory. Instead Nio, with the help of Lauw Giok Lan, his classmate's father, became a journalist with the newspaper Keng Po and the magazine Penghiboer. From 1928 to 1935 he served as Keng Po'''s editor before a reorganization in 1935 when he left for Sin Po, a competing paper.

In after transferring to Sin Po, Nio generally avoided mixing politics with his journalism, focusing instead on culture. Meanwhile, he wrote articles on various topics, including Chinese Malay literature, in Dutch journals such as De Indische Gids as well as English ones such as The China Journal. By this time he had become active in social work with the Tiong Hoa Hwe Koan, serving as its secretary. In 1939 Nio was part of a team which wrote a book commemorating the Tiong Hoa Hwe Koan's 40th anniversary. Sensing the cultural shift, by 1940 he stopped writing in English and Dutch and wrote almost exclusively in Indonesian.

When the Japanese occupied the Indies in February 1942, Nio was one of at least 542 ethnic Chinese from Java and Madura who were arrested and detained. He was held in Bukit Duri, then Serang, and then Cimahi, before ultimately being released in 1945 after the Japanese surrender and Indonesian proclamation of independence. A written account of his experiences while an internee was published in 1946, with the title Dalem Tawanan Djepang. Sinologist Myra Sidharta describes it as valuable account of history, as other former prisoners did not write such detailed memoirs.

Following his release Nio returned to Batavia (since renamed Jakarta) and Sin Po (which had recently restarted publication after three years of inactivity), heading that newspaper until 1958. At the same time he established the family-magazine Pantja Warna (1947–56). In the late 1950s Nio enrolled himself at the Jakarta Teachers' College, studying history. By 1963 he was a lecturer there, teaching history, while working freelance to translate works of Chinese literature, including parts of the Romance of the Three Kingdoms, the Ballad of Hua Mulan, and The Creation of the Gods. After 1965 he began writing more on the ethnic Dutch of the Indies.

Nio continued writing until 1972, dying on 13 February of the following year. According to Sidharta, during his life Nio produced almost 200 written works; nearly all were about the ethnic Chinese in Indonesia.

Partial bibliography
Some of Nio's works are listed below:Riwayat 40 Taon T.H.H.K. Batavia (History of 40 Years of T.H.H.K. Batavia; 1940)Dalem Tawanan Djepang (In Japanese Prison Camps; 1946)Peradaban Tionghoa Selajang Pandang (An Overview of Chinese Wisdom; 1961)Sastera Indonesia-Tionghoa (Chinese-Indonesian Literature; 1962)Punjtak-puntjak Kisah Tiga Negara (Highlights of the Romance of Three Kingdoms; 1963)Sastera Tiongkok Sepintas Lalu (An Overview of Chinese Literature''; 1966).

References

Works cited

 

1904 births
1973 deaths
Indonesian journalists
20th-century Indonesian historians
Indonesian people of Chinese descent
Indonesian writers
People from Batavia, Dutch East Indies
People from Jakarta
World War II civilian prisoners held by Japan
20th-century journalists